The 1955 Oklahoma A&M Aggies baseball team represented the Oklahoma Agricultural and Mechanical College in the 1955 NCAA baseball season.  The team was coached by Toby Greene in his 12th year at Oklahoma A&M.

The Aggies won the District V Playoff to advanced to the College World Series, where they were defeated by the Wake Forest Demon Deacons.

Roster

Schedule 

! style="" | Regular Season
|- valign="top" 

|- align="center" bgcolor="#ccffcc"
| 1 || March 21 || at  || Rice Baseball Field • Houston, Texas || 17–1 || 1–0 || –
|- align="center" bgcolor="#ccffcc"
| 2 || March 22 || at Rice || Rice Baseball Field • Houston, Texas || 13–4 || 2–0 || –
|- align="center" bgcolor="#ccffcc"
| 3 || March 24 || at  || Unknown • Huntsville, Texas || 8–4 || 3–0 || –
|- align="center" bgcolor="#ccffcc"
| 4 || March 30 || at Sam Houston State || Unknown • Huntsville, Texas || 6–1 || 4–0 || –
|-

|- align="center" bgcolor="#ccffcc"
| 5 || April 2 || vs  ||  •  || 10–9 || 5–0 || –
|- align="center" bgcolor="#ccffcc"
| 6 || April 5 || vs Oklahoma ||  •  || 6–1 || 6–0 || –
|- align="center" bgcolor="#ccffcc"
| 7 || April 12 || vs Oklahoma ||  •  || 10–6 || 7–0 || –
|- align="center" bgcolor="#ccffcc"
| 8 || April 15 || at Missouri || Rollins Field • Columbia, Missouri || 4–3 || 8–0 || –
|- align="center" bgcolor="#ccffcc"
| 9 || April 16 || at Missouri || Rollins Field • Columbia, Missouri || 10–7 || 9–0 || –
|- align="center" bgcolor="#ccffcc"
| 10 || April 18 || at  || Unknown • Lawrence, Kansas || 16–7 || 10–0 || –
|- align="center" bgcolor="#ccffcc"
| 11 || April 19 || at Kansas || Unknown • Lawrence, Kansas || 5–4 || 11–0 || –
|- align="center" bgcolor="#ccffcc"
| 12 || April  ||  ||  •  || 12–1 || 12–0 || –
|- align="center" bgcolor="#ccffcc"
| 13 || April  || Arkansas ||  •  || 7–1 || 13–0 || –
|- align="center" bgcolor="#ccffcc"
| 14 || April 26 || vs Oklahoma ||  •  || 7–3 || 14–0 || –
|- align="center" bgcolor="#ccffcc"
| 15 || April 29 ||  || Unknown • Stillwater, Oklahoma || 23–1 || 15–0 || 1–0
|- align="center" bgcolor="#ccffcc"
| 16 || April 30 || Wichita State || Unknown • Stillwater, Oklahoma || 34–2 || 16–0 || 2–0
|- align="center" bgcolor="#ccffcc"
| 17 || April 30 || Wichita State || Unknown • Stillwater, Oklahoma || 19–2 || 17–0 || 3–0
|-

|- align="center" bgcolor="#ccffcc"
| 18 || May 6 ||  ||  •  || 5–4 || 18–0 || 4–0
|- align="center" bgcolor="#ccffcc"
| 19 || May 7 || Tulsa ||  •  || 9–2 || 19–0 || 5–0
|- align="center" bgcolor="#ccffcc"
| 20 || May 7 || Tulsa ||  •  || 9–1 || 20–0 || 6–0
|- align="center" bgcolor="#ccffcc"
| 21 || May 13 ||  ||  •  || 10–2 || 21–0 || 7–0
|- align="center" bgcolor="#ccffcc"
| 22 || May 14 || Houston ||  •  || 8–5 || 22–0 || 8–0
|-

|-
|-
! style="" | Postseason
|- valign="top"

|- align="center" bgcolor="#ffcccc"
| 23 ||  || at Oklahoma || Unknown • Norman, Oklahoma || 0–3 || 22–1 || 8–0
|- align="center" bgcolor="#ccffcc"
| 24 ||  || at Oklahoma || Unknown • Norman, Oklahoma || 6–3 || 23–1 || 8–0
|- align="center" bgcolor="#ccffcc"
| 25 ||  || at Oklahoma || Unknown • Norman, Oklahoma || 6–2 || 24–1 || 8–0
|-

|- align="center" bgcolor="#ccffcc"
| 26 || June 10 || vs Springfield || Omaha Municipal Stadium • Omaha, Nebraska || 5–1 || 25–1 || 8–0
|- align="center" bgcolor="#ffcccc"
| 27 || June 12 || vs Western Michigan || Omaha Municipal Stadium • Omaha, Nebraska || 4–5 || 25–2 || 8–0
|- align="center" bgcolor="#ccffcc"
| 28 || June 13 || vs Colgate || Omaha Municipal Stadium • Omaha, Nebraska || 4–2 || 26–2 || 8–0
|- align="center" bgcolor="#ccffcc"
| 29 || June 14 || vs Arizona || Omaha Municipal Stadium • Omaha, Nebraska || 5–4 || 27–2 || 8–0
|- align="center" bgcolor="#ffcccc"
| 30 || June 15 || vs Wake Forest || Omaha Municipal Stadium • Omaha, Nebraska || 0–2 || 27–3 || 8–0
|-

Awards and honors 
Ronnie Bennett
 First Team All-American American Baseball Coaches Association

Tom Borland
 First Team All-American American Baseball Coaches Association
 College World Series Most Outstanding Player
 College World Series All-Tournament Team

References 

Oklahoma State Cowboys baseball seasons
Oklahoma State Cowboys baseball
College World Series seasons
Oklahoma AandM
Missouri Valley Conference baseball champion seasons